Trifolin is a chemical compound. It is the kaempferol 3-galactoside. It can be found in Camptotheca acuminata, in Euphorbia condylocarpa or in Consolida oliveriana.

Kaempferol 3-O-galactosyltransferase is an enzyme that catalyzes the chemical reaction:
UDP-galactose + kaempferol → UDP + kaempferol 3-O-beta-D-galactoside (trifolin). It can also be found in seedlings of Vigna mungo.

References 

Kaempferol glycosides
Flavonoid galactosides